This article displays the rosters for the participating teams at the 1999 Tournament of the Americas played in San Juan, Puerto Rico from July 14 to July 25, 1999.

Group A

Argentina

4 Luis Scola
5 Manu Ginóbili
6 Alejandro Montecchia
7 Andrés Nocioni
8 Lucas Victoriano
9 Hugo Sconochini
10 Juan Espil
11 Sergio Aispurúa
12 Leonardo Gutiérrez
13 Facundo Sucatzky
14 Leandro Palladino
15 Gabriel Fernández
Head coach:  Julio Lamas

Canada

4 Jordie McTavish
5 Sherman Hamilton
6 Andrew Mavis
7 Steve Nash
8 Shawn Swords
9 Rowan Barrett
10 Keith Vassell
11 Richard Elias Anderson
12 Todd MacCulloch
13 Peter Guarasci
14 Michael Meeks
15 Greg Newton
Head coach:  Jay Triano

Cuba

4 Ángel Caballero
5 Yudi Abreu
6 Edel Casanova
7 Roberto Amaro
8 Héctor Pino
9 Roberto Herrera García
10 Rabdel Echevarría
11 Lázaro Borrell
12 Sergio Ferrer
13 Eliécer Rojas
14 Ángel Núñez
15 Amiel Vega
Head coach:  Miguel Calderón Gómez

United States

4 Steve Smith
5 Jason Kidd
6 Allan Houston
7 Richard Hamilton
8 Tim Hardaway
9 Tom Gugliotta
10 Kevin Garnett
11 Vin Baker
12 Wally Szczerbiak
13 Tim Duncan
14 Gary Payton
15 Elton Brand
Head coach:  Larry Brown
Assistant coach: Tubby Smith

Uruguay

4 Camilo Acosta
5 Enrique Tucuna
6 Diego Losada
7 Diego Castrillón
8 Nicolás Mazzarino
9 Gabriel Abratanski
10 Jorge Cabrera
11 Oscar Moglia
12 Gustavo Szczygielski
13 Luis Silveira
14 Marcel Bouzout
15 Juan Manuel Moltedo
Head coach:  César Somma

Group B

Brazil

4 Marcelinho Machado
5 Ratto
6 Caio
7 Vanderlei
8 Sandro Varejão
9 Demétrius
10 Helinho
11 Aylton
12 Josuel
13 Michel
14 Rogério
15 Luiz Fernando
Head coach:  Hélio Rubens Garcia

Dominican Republic

Derek Baker
Ricardo Greer
Ocaris Lenderborg
Felipe López
Carlos Martínez
Rafael Novas
Carlos Paniagua
Carlos Payano
Jaime Peterson
Soterio Ramírez
Ricardo Vásquez
Franklin Western
Head coach:  Miguel Cruzeta

Panama

4 Kevin Daley
5 Alfonso Johnson
6 Dionisio Gómez
7 Maximiliano Gómez
8 Anthony Fiss
9 Damian Kirkaldy
10 Gonzalo Ortiz
11 Michael Hicks
12 Eric Cárdenas
13 Antonio García Murillo
14 Jason Wallace
15 Ulises Morán
Head coach:  Terry Layton

Puerto Rico

4 José Ortiz
5 Eddie Casiano
6 Orlando Santiago
7 Carmelo Travieso
8 Jerome Mincy
9 James Carter
10 Edgar Padilla
11 Orlando Vega
12 Fernando Ortiz
13 Sharif Fajardo
14 Luis Allende
15 Daniel Santiago
Head coach:  Julio Toro

Venezuela

4 Víctor David Díaz
5 Harold Keeling
6 Ernesto Mijares
7 Richard Lugo
8 Alex Quiroz
9 Óscar Torres
10 Alexander Vargas
11 Alexander Nelcha
12 Vladimir Heredia
13 Heberth Bayona
14 Armando Becker
15 Omar Walcott
Head coach:  Guillermo Vecchio

Bibliography

External links
1999 squads at Latinbasket.com

FIBA AmeriCup squads